Wacław Wąsowicz (25 August 1891 – 6 October 1942) was a Polish painter and printmaker.

Wacław Wasowicz studied art with Wojciech Gerson (1909–1910), afterwards he studied at the School of Fine Arts in Warsaw (1911–1914), where he was taught by Ignacy Pieńkowski. He had also studied at the Jan Matejko Academy of Fine Arts in Kraków, where he was a student of Jacek Malczewski (1914). He had made his artwork using trompe-l'œil, printmaking, watercolour, he painted on fabric, and on ceramic.

His wife Janina Raabe-Wąsowiczowa was a social worker, and a member of the Konrad Żegota Committee.

References

External links

1891 births
1942 deaths
19th-century Polish painters
19th-century Polish male artists
20th-century Polish painters
20th-century Polish male artists
Polish male painters